XHUZ-FM is a radio station in Aguascalientes, Aguascalientes. Owned by Radiogrupo, it broadcasts on 105.3 FM and carries a CHR format under the name "105 Digital".

XHUZ was authorized for HD Radio in 2015 and was the first station in the state to receive such authorization.

References

Radio stations in Aguascalientes
Mass media in Aguascalientes City